Everything Perfect on the Wrong Day is the first album by Texan metalcore and electronic band Sky Eats Airplane. The album was recorded in early 2006 was originally released on August 6 through Thriving Records. The album was re-released on November 20, 2007 through Tragic Hero Records.

Track listing

Personnel
Sky Eats Airplane
Brack Cantrell - lead vocals, rhythm guitar, bass guitar, keyboards, synthesizers, programming
Lee Duck - vocals, lead guitar, drums, percussion, keyboards, synthesizers, programming
Production
Produced by members Brack Cantrell and Lee Duck

Reception

Upon its release, Everything Perfect on the Wrong Day received mixed reviews from music critics.

AllMusic reviewer Eduardo Rivadavia gave the album a mixed review, comparing the album's sound to Horse the Band and Genghis Tron. Rivadavia criticized the album's short songs and lack of cohesion, but did say the album was intriguing. Punk News reviewer Matt Wheilan was highly critical of the album, calling the mixing of metalcore with electronic elements "a poor concept being poorly executed." Wheilan specifically criticized the track "She Is Just a Glitch," calling the beat boring, the synth string useless, and the lyrics clichéd.

A positive review came from Exclaim!'s Dave Synyard, who praised the band's use of electronic drums. Synyard concluded his review by stating "if you're a little tired of the same old, Sky Eats Airplane will hit reset for you."

Vinyl Release
On August 14, 2020, Sky Eats Airplane posted on Facebook for the first time in 8 years to announce that the album was being pressed on vinyl.

"We’re excited to tell you that our old friends at Tragic Hero Records are pressing a limited quantity of 'Everything Perfect on the Wrong Day' to vinyl for the first time ever," They wrote. "It’s amazing to see that this album still resonates with fans and musicians alike, even after 14 years."

The vinyl's estimated street date is November 27, 2020.

References

Sky Eats Airplane albums
2006 debut albums
Tragic Hero Records albums